Eggjareid Station is a railway station along the Bergensbanen railway line.  It is located at the village of Eggjareid in the Raundalen valley in the municipality of Voss in Vestland county, Norway. The station was served by the Bergen Commuter Rail until its closure in 2012. The station was opened in 1936.

External links
 Jernbaneverket's page on Eggjareid

Railway stations in Voss
Railway stations on Bergensbanen
Railway stations opened in 1936
1936 establishments in Norway